This is a list of British colours lost in battle. Since reforms in 1747 each infantry regiment carried two colours, or flags, to identify it on the battlefield: a king's colour of the union flag and a regimental colour of the same colour as the regiment's facings.  The colours were regarded as talismans of the regiment and it was considered a stain on the unit's honour if they were captured.  To prevent this, the colours were protected in the field by a colour party of young officers and experienced sergeants, around which the regiment would rally. As the 19th century progressed, regiments found their colour parties became increasingly vulnerable and some chose not to carry them in the field. The loss of two colours at the 1879 Battle of Isandlwana led to parliamentary debates on whether they should still be carried in the field. Heavy casualties among the colour party of the 58th (Rutlandshire) Regiment of Foot at the 1881 Battle of Laing's Nek led to a ban on them being carried in battle and since 1882 none have been taken on active service.

Background 

The colours, flags, of a British Army infantry regiment serve to identify the unit and mark a rallying point for its troops.  They were particularly important in early warfare when smoke on the battlefield could make it hard to discern friend from foe.  The colours developed into important talismans for the regiments, representing its traditions and honour; to capture an enemy colour was considered a great achievement while allowing one's own colours to be captured, or "lost" to the enemy was considered a stain on the regiment's honour.  In combat the colours were carried by ensigns, the most junior and often youngest of the regiment's officers and were placed in the front and centre of the unit. Because of their value and conspicuity the ensigns faced considerable risk.  To assist the ensigns (who were often just 16 years old) in handling the heavy flags and to protect the colours a number of experienced sergeants, armed with spontoons, were assigned to the colour party. From 1813 a new rank, colour sergeant, was introduced for these men as a mark of honour.  If the colour party took casualties other officers, sergeants and, if necessary, other ranks would take their place.  At the 1815 Battle of Waterloo 14 sergeants of the 40th (the 2nd Somersetshire) Regiment of Foot were killed or wounded while serving in the colour party and at the 1854 Battle of the Alma the colour party of the 21st (Royal North British Fusilier) Regiment of Foot lost 3 officers and 17 sergeants.

Colours were first regulated by order of George II in 1747.  The recent Jacobite rising of 1745 had prompted the king to set in place army reforms to standardise uniforms, drill and tactics.  He was keen to ensure the soldiers' loyalty to the crown rather than the colonel of their regiment (regiments up to this time were known by their colonel's name rather than an ordinal number). The colours of line infantry regiments had previously varied in number and design according to the whims of their colonel; many bore the personal arms of their commander, rather than any national or royal insignia. George's reforms standardised the colours to two per regiment: a "king's colour" (known as a "royal" or "queen's colour" during the reign of a queen), based on the union flag and a "second colour" (later known as the "regimental colour") with a field in the colour of the regiment's facings defaced by the new regimental numbers.  It was common for infantry colours to be consecrated by an Anglican priest, and by 1825 it became the norm that colours would be consecrated when being formally presented to the regiment, though there were exceptions.

Preventing capture 

Regiments usually took great care to avoid their colours from falling into the hands of the enemy.  During the surrender at Saratoga  the colours of the 9th Regiment of Foot were smuggled back to England by their colonel, which was viewed by the Americans as a violation of the terms of the surrender.  The colours of the 94th Regiment of Foot were saved during the surrender following the 1880 Battle of Bronkhorstspruit by being hidden beneath the bed of a wounded soldier's wife, in an ambulance allowed to return to British lines.  On other occasions the colours have been deliberately destroyed to prevent their capture.  The colours of the  51st (2nd Yorkshire West Riding) Regiment of Foot (Light Infantry) were burnt by their colonel at the 1811 Battle of Fuentes de Oñoro when he feared they were at risk of capture and on several occasions regiments threatened with capture while being transported at sea have weighted their colours and thrown them overboard.  On some occasions regiments have been offered the right to keep their colours during surrender negotiations, such was the case with the colours of the 4th, 23rd, 24th and 34th regiments of foot who retained their colours after the 1782 surrender of Minorca.  Despite the value placed on them colours were sometimes lost off the battlefield, the 71st (Highland) Regiment of Foot (MacLeod's Highlanders) left them at their depot in Britain during the Peninsular War but could not find them upon their return; a light infantry regiment lost one colour in the post during the 19th century.

The colours of units fighting in open order as light infantry were particularly vulnerable to attack and, as early as 1808, many such units did not carry their colours in the field.  In battle the colours were sometimes sent to the rear if they were considered to be at risk or attracting too much enemy fire.  Sometimes commanders considered the carrying of colours to be a hindrance to their units and ordered them left behind, as did General James Abercrombie during the 1758 Ticonderoga campaign.  By the 1860s many infantry regiments posted on active service chose to leave their colours safely behind at their depots.

After the loss of the colours of the 24th (The 2nd Warwickshire) Regiment of Foot at the 1879 Battle of Isandlwana there were debates in parliament as to whether colours should continue to be carried in the field.  These were renewed after the heavy casualties suffered by the colour party of the 58th (Rutlandshire) Regiment of Foot at the 28 January 1881 Battle of Laing's Nek; British General Garnet Wolseley remarked that after this engagement any colonel that ordered the colours to be carried into action should be tried for the murders of the men lost carrying them.  The action led to the Secretary of State for War Hugh Childers issuing instructions on 29 July that colours were no longer to be taken into the field.  This was reinforced by a 2 March 1882 order from the Commander-in-Chief of the Forces, the Duke of Cambridge, that regiments posted on active service leave their colours behind.  The colours of the 58th at Laing's Nek became the last to be carried into battle and those of the 1st battalion of the South Staffordshire Regiment the last to be taken on active service when they were at Alexandria in 1882.

Units without colours 
Only the flags of British infantry regiments are known as colours, the flags of British cavalry regiments are called standards; these were not consecrated, and do not seem to have attracted the same level of veneration as their infantry counterparts.  From the early 19th century it became increasingly rare for cavalry standards to be taken into battle; very few were carried during the Peninsular War, for example.  The light dragoons (a class of light cavalry that also included hussars and lancers) ceased to carry any standards after 1834, as by this time they fought most often as skirmishers in open order and hence would not be able to protect their standard.

Infantry regiments lost their colours when designated as rifle units, which were intended to fight in skirmish order; this includes the 95th (Rifle) Regiment of Foot, the 60th (Royal American) Regiment of Foot and their modern-day successor The Rifles.  The Marines (from 1802 the Royal Marines), were organised into companies with only their administrative divisions receiving colours, which were not carried in the field.  The Royal Artillery did not carry colours, with their guns being considered the equivalent.

List 
This is a list of colours lost on the battlefield, or surrendered immediately afterwards, by infantry regiments of the British army since the 1747 reforms.  Colours temporarily lost and recovered in the course of the battle are not listed.  The list does not include units of the East India Company armies (and later the British Indian Army), colonial troops or militia.

References 

British Army
Military flags
Flags of the United Kingdom